Walnut Lane was a historic home located near Newark, New Castle County, Delaware. It was built about 1835, and is an "L" shaped brick residence. The main house was a  story, five bay, single pile structure with a Greek Revival style front portico. It had a two bay brick ell, with a  story frame addition.

It was added to the National Register of Historic Places in 1979. It was demolished before 1992.

References

Houses on the National Register of Historic Places in Delaware
Greek Revival houses in Delaware
Houses completed in 1835
Houses in Newark, Delaware
National Register of Historic Places in New Castle County, Delaware